The British Academy Book Prize was an annual book award held by the British Academy in the period from 2000 and 2005.  Eligible titles were those covering areas of the humanities and social sciences.

Winners
 2001 Rees Davies for The First English Empire: Power and Identities in the British Isles 1093-1343, jointly with Ian Kershaw for Hitler: 1936–1945, Nemesis
 2002 Stanley Cohen  for States of Denial: Knowing about Atrocities and Suffering
 2003 Elizabeth Cowling for Picasso Style and Meaning
 2004 Diarmaid MacCulloch for Reformation: Europe's House Divided 1490-1700
 2005 N.A.M. Rodger for The Command of the Sea: A Naval History of Britain, 1649-1815

References

Book Prize
Awards established in 2000
2000 establishments in the United Kingdom
Awards disestablished in 2005
2005 disestablishments in the United Kingdom
British non-fiction literary awards
Annual events in the United Kingdom